The Emperors (also billed as The Emperor's) were an American soul band from Harrisburg, Pennsylvania, formed in the early 1960s.

The group had its first breakthrough when producer Phil Gaber noticed the group and recorded their first single, "Karate", in 1966. The song was released on Mala Records and became a hit; the song was a regional smash in the Philadelphia area, reached the Top 30 of the national R&B charts, and peaked at #55 on the Billboard Hot 100. Their follow-up single was a cover of Don Gardner's tune "My Baby Likes to Boogaloo", and another single, "Searchin'", followed in 1967 before the group signed with Brunswick Records. One single, "Karate Boogaloo", followed on the label before Bobby Fulton left the group to start Soulville Records. The group then renamed itself Emperors Soul 69 and recorded the single "Bring Out Yourself" for Futura Records before disbanding.

The group's output was reissued on LP and CD in 2002.

Members
Danny Sullivan on B-3 organ with double stack Leslie speaker?
James Jackson
Donald Brantley
Bobby Fulton
Edgar Moore 
David Peterson
Billy Green
Tyrone Moss
Milton Brown Jr.
Steve Stephens
Ronnie Burnett
Dred”Perky” Scott

References

American soul musical groups
Musical groups from Pennsylvania